Andrea Olsen (born December 24, 1961) is an American politician who served in the Montana House of Representatives for the 100th district from 2015 to 2023.

References

1961 births
Living people
Politicians from Missoula, Montana
Women state legislators in Montana
21st-century American politicians
21st-century American women politicians
Democratic Party members of the Montana House of Representatives